CCTV-12 is the law and society focused channel of the CCTV (China Central Television) Network in the People's Republic of China.

Programmes 
 Record of Startup (实习志)
 Hot Talk [热话]
 Lawyer is Coming (律师来了)
 Police Training Camp [警察特训营]
 Record of Regret (忏悔录)
 Ethical Review [道德观察]
 Heaven's Web (天网)
 The Red of the Setting Sun (夕阳红)

External links

China Central Television channels
Television channels and stations established in 2002
2002 establishments in China